Dichomeris phoenogramma is a moth in the family Gelechiidae. It was described by Edward Meyrick in 1930. It is found in Pará, Brazil.

The forewings are lilac grey partially sprinkled with brownish and with the costa slenderly dull rosy from the base to three-fourths. The extreme edge is ochreous and the markings are fulvous brown, consisting of a short irregular transverse line in the disc at one-fifth, a rather curved irregular transverse streak before the middle from towards the costa to beneath the fold, a dot beyond the apex of this, a slender irregular streak on the transverse vein, an irregular undefined transverse shade near beyond this, not crossing the costal streak, and a similar irregular shade from the costa at four-fifths to the tornus. There is also a marginal series of black triangular dots around the apical part of the costa and termen. The hindwings are grey.

References

Moths described in 1930
phoenogramma